Černovice is a municipality and village in Chomutov District in the Ústí nad Labem Region of the Czech Republic. It has about 600 inhabitants.

References

External links

 

Villages in Chomutov District